Modesto Castillo (born 24 February 1959, in La Romana, Dominican Republic) is a former sprint and hurdling athlete who specialised in the 110 metres hurdles.

Castillo represented the Dominican Republic at the 1984 Summer Olympics in Los Angeles, United States, being eliminated in the first round of the 110 metres hurdles after finishing fifth in his heat. Four years later he competed for the Dominican team at the 1988 Summer Olympics in Seoul, South Korea. He qualified from his heat in the 110 metres hurdles before being eliminated in the quarterfinals.

References

External links
Athlete profile for Modesto Castillo at IAAF.org

1959 births
Living people
Dominican Republic male hurdlers
Olympic athletes of the Dominican Republic
Athletes (track and field) at the 1984 Summer Olympics
Athletes (track and field) at the 1988 Summer Olympics
Athletes (track and field) at the 1983 Pan American Games
Athletes (track and field) at the 1987 Pan American Games
Pan American Games medalists in athletics (track and field)
Pan American Games silver medalists for the Dominican Republic
Central American and Caribbean Games bronze medalists for the Dominican Republic
Competitors at the 1982 Central American and Caribbean Games
Central American and Caribbean Games medalists in athletics
World Athletics Championships athletes for the Dominican Republic
Medalists at the 1987 Pan American Games
20th-century Dominican Republic people
21st-century Dominican Republic people